Leo Laporte (born November 29, 1956) is the former host of The Tech Guy weekly radio show and a host on TWiT.tv, an Internet podcast network focusing on technology. He is also a former TechTV technology host (1998–2008) and a technology author. On November 19, 2022, actor, writer, musician, and comedian Steve Martin called in to Laporte's radio show to announce Leo's retirement from The Tech Guy radio show.  Laporte's last new radio show will be December 18, 2022 with reruns for the remainder of the year.  Rich DeMuro later appeared on the show to announce that he will be taking over in January with a weekly show, recorded on Saturdays, called "Rich On Tech."

Background 
Laporte was born in New York City, the son of geologist Leo F. Laporte. He studied Chinese history at Yale University before dropping out in his junior year to pursue a career in radio broadcasting, where his early on-air names were Dave Allen and Dan Hayes. He began his association with computers with his first home computer, an Atari 400.  By 1984 he owned a Macintosh and wrote a software review for Byte magazine.

Television and radio 
Laporte has worked on technology-related broadcasting projects, including Dvorak on Computers in January 1991 (co-hosted with technology writer John C. Dvorak), and Laporte on Computers on KGO Radio and KSFO in San Francisco.

In 1997, Laporte was awarded a Northern California Emmy for his role as Dev Null, a motion capture character on the MSNBC show The Site.

In 1998, Laporte created and co-hosted The Screen Savers, and the original version of Call for Help on the cable and satellite network ZDTV (later TechTV).

Laporte was the host of the daily television show The Lab with Leo Laporte, recorded in Vancouver, British Columbia, Canada. The program had formerly been known as Call for Help when it was recorded in the US and Toronto, Ontario, Canada. The series aired on G4 Canada, on the HOW TO Channel in Australia, on several of Canada's Citytv affiliates, and on Google Video. On March 5, 2008, Laporte confirmed on net@nite that The Lab with Leo Laporte had been canceled by Rogers Communications. The HOW TO Channel did not air the remaining episodes after it was announced the show had been canceled.

He hosted, until December 2022, a weekend technology-oriented talk radio program show titled Leo Laporte: The Tech Guy. The show, started on KFI AM 640 (Los Angeles), was syndicated through Premiere Radio Networks. Laporte appeared on Friday mornings on KFI with Bill Handel, and previously on such shows as Showbiz Tonight, Live with Kelly, and World News Now. 

He holds an amateur radio license, W6TWT.

Bibliography
Laporte has written technology-oriented books including:

He has published a yearly series of technology almanacs:

Leo Laporte's Technology Almanac
Poor Leo's Computer Almanac 
Leo Laporte's 2006 Technology Almanac 

Laporte announced in October 2006 that he would not renew his contract with Que Publishing, and had retired from publishing books.

In 2008, Laporte did a voice narration of Andrew Lang's fable The True History of Little Golden-hood from Audible (Amazon), a sponsor.

Podcasting 
Laporte owns and operates a podcast network, TWiT.tv with his wife Lisa Laporte. In a 2012 Reddit posting, he commented that revenue was approaching million (equivalent to $ in ). The TWiT studios are located in Petaluma, California, where Laporte lives.

References

External links 

 
 
 

Living people
American bloggers
American podcasters
American talk radio hosts
Television personalities from California
Canadian television hosts
TechTV people
People from Sonoma County, California
People from New York City
Emmy Award winners
Amateur radio people
TWiT.tv people
Berkeley Macintosh Users Group members
1956 births